Justina David (born 1912), sometimes credited as Justiniana David, was a Filipina film actress during the mid-20th century , often appearing as a martyred wife, a peasant, or a hopeless mother. Her career began before World War II and extended to the late 1960s.

Born in 1912, she first appeared as a bit player in Sampaguita Pictures' Pasang Krus (Shouldered Cross), then progressed to various pre-war musical films at Sampaguita, including Magbalik ka, Hirang (Comeback, Darling), Gunita (Memory) with Corazon Noble, Carmen with Carmen Rosales, Balatkayo with Rudy Concepcion and Pagsuyo (Love).

After World War II, in 1947, she made a comeback in the LVN Pictures films Backpay with Corazon Noble and Rogelio dela Rosa and Krus na Bituin (Crossed Star).

In 1954, she returned to Sampaguita and made dozens of movies, including Pilya where she played the mother of Gloria Romero.

In 1956, she moved to Larry Santiago Production for Mrs Jose Romulo with Jose Romulo himself.

Filmography
1939 - Pasang Krus
1940 - Magbalik ka, Hirang
1940 - Gunita
1941 - Carmen
1941 - Balatkayo
1941 - Pagsuyo
1946 - Victory Joe (LVN)
1947 - Backpay
1947 - Romansa (LVN)
1948 - Krus na Bituin
1948 - Waling-Waling
1949 - Milyonarya
1949 - Makabagong Pilipina
1949 - Tambol Mayor
1949 - Prinsesa Basahan
1949 - Hen. Gregorio del Pilar
1949 - Batalyon XIII
1950 - Nuno sa Punso
1951 - Makapili
1951 - Bayan O Pag-ibig
1951 - Anak ng Pulubi
1953 - Siklab sa Batangas (Sampaguita)
1954 - Pilya
1955 - Tatay na si Bondying
1955 - D 1-13
1955 - Bulaklak sa Parang
1955 - Sa Dulo ng Landas
1956 - Rodora
1956 - Mrs. Jose Romulo
1957 - Pasang Krus
1957 - Kandilang Bakal
1957 - Objective: Patayin si Magsaysay

External links

1912 births
Possibly living people
20th-century Filipino actresses
Filipino film actresses